At the 2010 Summer Youth Olympics, 36 athletics events were contested – 18 for boys and 18 for girls – on 17–19 and 21–23 August 2010. The events took place in Bishan Stadium, Singapore. Athletes born between January 1, 1993, and December 31, 1994, were eligible to compete. Continents selected their athletes through Youth Continental Championships (Continental Youth Olympic Trials).

While most events mirrored those at the Summer Olympic Games, some events were distinct from the Games' senior counterpart. A 1000 metres race was scheduled in place of the more traditional 800/1,500 metres races. The steeplechase was held over 2000 m, instead of the seniors' 3000 m distance, and the competition featured a medley relay with legs of 100 m, 200 m, 300 m and 400 m (in the Swedish style). Combined (or multi-discipline) events were not contested.

Competition format

Qualification 
The six continents, Africa, Asia, Europe, North America, Oceania and South America, held their Youth Olympic Trials in 2010.

Games events

Seventeen individual events and one relay were contested, making a total of 18 events for girls and boys. Some events differed between the girls and the boys.

Sprints, Hurdles, and Relays
For the sprints, hurdles, and relays, there were two stages consisting of two rounds: Round 1 and the Finals. Depending on the final number of entries, two to three or more heats were necessary. From results achieved in Round 1, athletes were placed in A, B or C (or additional) Finals, in accordance with procedures determined by the Event Delegate. Final placings in each discipline were determined by adding each athlete's time in the Stage 1 Final to his or her time in the Stage 2 Final. Ties were resolved in favour of the athlete with the faster time in either Final.

Mid and Long Distance
Some confusion was caused by a mid-2009 Singapore Athletics document appearing to suggest that placings in the heats and the finals would be added to give a final placing. Depending on their performance in the heats, athletes were allocated to a A, B or C final. The final placings were decided by the placings in the final only, and the placings in the A final determined the medals with no reference to the heats. The B final determined positions 9–16 and so on.

Horizontal Jumps and Throws
Similar to the Mid and Long Distance events. In the finals for each event, athletes had four attempts.

High Jump and Pole Vault
Similar to Mid and Long Distance events. Final placings in each discipline were determined by adding each athlete's best result in the Stage 1 Final to his or her best result in the Stage 2 Final. Ties were resolved in favour of the athlete with the best individual result in either Final.

100 metres
200 metres
400 metres
100 metre hurdles (Girls only)
110 metre hurdles (Boys only)
400 metre hurdles
800 metres
1000 metres
3000 metres
2000-metre Steeplechase (SC)
5000-metre Race Walk (Girls only)
10,000-metre Race Walk (Boys only)
Medley relay (100-200-300-400 m)
Discus (Boys: 1.5 kg, Girls: 1 kg)
Shot put (Boys: 5 kg, Girls: 4 kg)
Hammer (Boys: 5 kg, Girls: 4 kg)
Javelin (Boys: 700g, Girls: 600g)
Pole vault
High jump
Long jump
Triple jump

Competition schedule

Day 1

Day 2

Day 3

Medal summary

Medal table

Events

Boys' events

Girls' events

Participating nations
170 nations will participate in athletics.:Universality Rules Athletes

See also
Athletics at the 1998 World Youth Games

References 
Specific

Day reports
Post, Marty (2010-08-17). Strong performances in qualifying - Youth Olympic Games, Day 1. IAAF. Retrieved on 2010-08-19.
Post, Marty (2010-08-18). Favourites continue to shine in Singapore - Youth Olympic Games, Day 2. IAAF. Retrieved on 2010-08-19.
Post, Marty (2010-08-19). Fields set for Singapore finals – Youth Olympic Games, Day 3. IAAF. Retrieved on 2010-08-19.
Post, Marty (2010-08-21). Skeen and Bengtsson deliver on Singapore expectations – Youth Olympic Games, Day 4. IAAF. Retrieved on 2010-08-24.
Post, Marty (2010-08-22). Brzozowski sets Shot Put World youth best in Singapore – Youth Olympic Games, Day 5. IAAF. Retrieved on 2010-08-24.
Post, Marty (2010-08-23). Athletics programme of Youth Olympic Games ends on high note in Singapore – Day 6. IAAF. Retrieved on 2010-08-24.

External links

Schedule
Youth Olympics athletics homepage at IAAF

 
Summer Youth Olympics
2010 Summer Youth Olympics events
2010
2010 Summer Youth Olympics